The Biffen Lecture is a lectureship organised by the John Innes Centre, named after Rowland Biffen.

Lecturers
Source: John Innes Centre
 2001 John Doebley
 2002 Francesco Salamini
 2003 Steven D. Tanksley
 2004 Michael Freeling
 2006 Dick Flavell
 2008 Rob Martienssen – 'Propagating silent heterochromatin with RNA interference in plants and fission yeast'
 2009 Susan McCouch, Department of Plant Breeding & Genetics, Cornell University – 'Gene flow and genetic isolation during crop evolution'
 2010 Peter Langridge, University of Adelaide, Australia – 'Miserable but worth the trouble: Genomics, wheat and difficult environments'
 2012 Sarah Hake, Plant Gene Expression Center, USDA-ARS – 'Patterning the maize leaf'
 2014 Professor Pamela Ronald, Department of Plant Pathology & The Genome Center, University of California Davis – ‘Engineering crops for resistance to disease and tolerance of stress’
 2015 Professor Lord May, Department of Zoology, University of Oxford – ‘Unanswered questions in ecology, and why they matter’
 2016 Edward Buckler, US Department of Agriculture – ‘Breeding 4.0? Sorting through the adaptive and deleterious variants in maize and beyond’

See also

 List of genetics awards

References

Genetics awards
Genetics in the United Kingdom
Science and technology in Norfolk
Science lecture series